Sean Barron is a journalist for The Youngstown Vindicator in Ohio.

He is the co-author of two books about autism. There's a Boy in Here: Emerging from the Bonds of Autism was written with his mother, Judy Barron.  With Temple Grandin he co-authored Unwritten Rules of Social Relationships: Decoding Social Mysteries Through the Unique Perspectives of Autism.  He met his girlfriend, Barbara Protopapa, at one of his book signings.  Although diagnosed autistic at the age of 4, in 1965, he considers himself "healed" from autism, because it no longer adversely affects his day-to-day life.  In 1992 he began to speak publicly at autism conferences about his experiences.

References

American non-fiction writers
Living people
People on the autism spectrum
Year of birth missing (living people)